Entoloma alboumbonatum is an inedible species of fungus in the agaric genus Entoloma. Found in the United States, it was described by mycologist Lexemuel Ray Hesler in 1967.

See also
List of Entoloma species

References

External links

Entolomataceae
Fungi described in 1967
Fungi of the United States
Inedible fungi
Fungi without expected TNC conservation status